Felicitas Pauss is an Austrian physicist. She obtained her PhD,  Berechnung von Neutron-Proton Polarisationsobservablen ("Calculation of neutron/proton polarization observables"), from University of Graz, Austria, in 1976. Pauss has published almost 1500 scientific papers and has given over 450 talks. From 2009 to 2013 she was in charge of International Relations at CERN. Prior to becoming a professor at Swiss Federal Institute of Technology at Zurich in 1993, while at Cornell and CERN, she was member of UA1 and L3 collaborations. In 1994, she joined the CMS collaboration and contributed to its design, construction, and management.

References 

Austrian women physicists
Austrian physicists
1951 births
Living people

People associated with CERN